The 1970–71 Copa del Generalísimo was the 69th staging of the Spanish Cup football competition. It began on 14 October 1970 and concluded on 4 July 1971 with the final.

First round

|}
Bye: Real Jaén.

Second round

|}
Bye: Real Murcia, SDC Michelín, UD Salamanca, CA Osasuna, Cultural Leonesa and Tenerife Atlético Club.

Third round

|}

Fourth round

|}
Bye: Real Betis, Club Ferrol, Tenerife Atlético Club, CA Osasuna, Deportivo La Coruña, UP Langreo, CD Logroñés, RCD Mallorca, Real Oviedo, Pontevedra CF, CD Castellón and Villarreal CF.

Round of 32

|}

Round of 16

|}

Quarter-finals

|}

Semi-finals

|}

Final

|}

External links
 rsssf.com
 linguasport.com

Copa del Rey seasons
Copa del Rey
Copa